Zwencyl DeVonte Upson (born March 23, 1993) is an American basketball player for Hapoel Haifa in the Israeli Basketball Premier League. He plays the center position. He played college basketball for Trinidad State College and Southeastern Louisiana University.

Early life
Upson was born in Augusta, Georgia, to Zwencyl Upson and Lelinda Parksand, and lived in Amarillo, Texas.

He attended Harrison High School ('11) in Colorado Springs, Colorado. Playing basketball for the high school as a senior, Upson averaged 11.4 points, 9.8 rebounds, and 4.4 blocks per game.

College career
In 2011-13, Upson attended and played basketball at Trinidad State College. In his freshman season, he averaged 9.0 points, 6.0 rebounds, and 1.5 blocks per game, shooting 61.8% from the field. In his sophomore year, he averaged 10.8 points, 7.3 rebounds, and 1.7 blocks (2nd in NJCAA Region IX) per game.

In 2013-15, he attended and played basketball at Southeastern Louisiana University ('15). In 2013-14, Upson averaged 8.3 points, 6.1 rebounds, and 1.7 blocked shots per game. In 2015, he averaged 10.8 points, 7.4 rebounds, and 1.5 blocks per game and was All-Southland Conference Honorable Mention.

Professional career
In 2015-16, Upson played for Starwings Basket Regio Basel of Switzerland's LNA. He averaged 14.6 points, 9.6 rebounds (3rd in the LNA) and 1.0 blocks (3rd) per game. In 2016-17, he played for Helsinki Seagulls of Finland's Korisliiga. He averaged 19.6 points and 0.9 blocks (5th in the league) per game.

In 2017-18, he played for Rapla BS of Estonia's Korvpalli Meistriliiga. Upson averaged 10.9 points, 7.2 rebounds, and 1.1 blocks (2nd in the league) per game. In June 2018, he was signed by the Beijing Bucks in the Chinese National Basketball League. Playing for them, he averaged 18 points, 14 rebounds, and 2.4 blocks per game.

In 2018-19, Upson played for Polski Cukier Pszczolka Start Lublin of the Polish Basketball League, averaging 9.7 points, 6.4 rebounds (5th in the league), and 1.1 blocks (2nd) per game. In 2019, he played for Comunicaciones Mercedes of Argentina's Liga, averaging 5.8 points, 5.3 rebounds, and 0.9 blocks per game.

In 2019-20, he played for Asseco Arka Gdynia of the Polish Basketball League, averaging 7.6 points, 3.8 rebounds, and 1.0 blocks per game. In 2020, Upson played one game for Strasbourg IG of France's Jeep Elite, before the pandemic ended the season.

In 2020-21, he played for Pallacanestro Trieste 2004 of Italy's Lega Basket Serie A, and averaged 7.1 points, 4.8 rebounds, and 0.4 blocks per game. In 2021-22, he played for Merkezefendi Belediyesi Denizli Basket of Turkey's Basketbol Süper Ligi. He averaged 8.8 points, 6.8 rebounds (9th in the league), and 0.8 blocks (6th) per game, while shooting 68% from the field.

In 2022-23, Upson plays for Hapoel Haifa of the Israeli Basketball Premier League.

References

External links
Instagram page

1993 births
Living people
American expatriate basketball people in Argentina
American expatriate basketball people in China
American expatriate basketball people in Estonia
American expatriate basketball people in Finland
American expatriate basketball people in France
American expatriate basketball people in Israel
American expatriate basketball people in Italy
American expatriate basketball people in Poland
American expatriate basketball people in Switzerland
American expatriate basketball people in Turkey
American men's basketball players
Basketball players from Augusta, Georgia
Basketball players from Colorado
Basketball players from Texas
Centers (basketball)
Club Comunicaciones (Mercedes)
Hapoel Haifa B.C. players
Israeli Basketball Premier League players
Pallacanestro Trieste players
SIG Basket players
Southeastern Louisiana Lions basketball players
Sportspeople from Amarillo, Texas
Trinidad State College